The women's pole vault event  at the 2002 European Athletics Indoor Championships was held on March 1–3.

Medalists

Results

Qualification
Qualification: Qualification Performance 4.35 (Q) or at least 8 best performers advanced to the final.

Final

References
Results

Pole vault at the European Athletics Indoor Championships
Pole
2002 in women's athletics